Malkovec is a viticultural settlement along the road on the ridge of Malkovec Hill,  southeast of Tržišče, in the Municipality of Sevnica in the Sava region of Slovenia. The municipality is included in the Lower Sava Statistical Region. The area is part of the traditional region of Lower Carniola.

References

External links
Malkovec at Geopedia

Populated places in the Municipality of Sevnica